Oskari Laaksonen (born 2 July 1999) is a Finnish professional ice hockey defenseman who is currently playing with the Texas Stars in the American Hockey League (AHL) as a prospect to the Dallas Stars of the National Hockey League (NHL). He was selected by the Buffalo Sabres in the third round, 89th overall, of the 2017 NHL Entry Draft.

Playing career 
Laaksonen as a youth played with Ilves' U16, U18, and U20 teams. After playing for Ilves U20, Laaksonen was drafted 89th overall by the Sabres in the 2017 NHL Entry Draft.

Laaksonen made his Liiga debut during the 2017–18 season, on 9 January 2018, in a 6–5 defeat to HPK. He played out the season to contribute with 4 assists in 21 games.

On 15 June 2020, Laaksonen was signed by the Sabres to a three-year, entry-level contract. It was announced he would initially continue his tenure with Ilves for the 2020–21 season, however on 21 September 2020, Laaksonen was loaned by the Sabres to fellow Liiga club, Lahti Pelicans.

Entering the 2022–23 season assigned to begin his third year with the Sabres AHL affiliate, the Rochester Americans, Laaksonen was limited to just 10 appearances through the opening months. On 15 December 2022, Laaksonen was traded by the Sabres to the Dallas Stars in exchange for Joseph Cecconi. He was immediately re-assigned to join their AHL club in Texas.

International play

Laaksonen appeared for Finland in 6 junior international friendly games in 2016, before he was later selected to represent his country at the 2019 World Junior Championships in Vancouver, British Columbia, Canada. He collected 1 goal in 7 games from the blueline, helping Finland claim the gold medal for their 5th title.

Career statistics

Regular season and playoffs

International

References

External links 

1999 births
Living people
Buffalo Sabres draft picks
Finnish ice hockey defencemen
Ilves players
Lahti Pelicans players
Rochester Americans players
Ice hockey people from Tampere
Texas Stars players